Begum is a female title which is also used in Mirza families/lineages, Daughter of Beg or Wife of Beg, a given name and surname.

Historic title
Some examples of women with the title of Begum for example Nawabs of Bhopal or Begum of Bhopal.

Women with the title Begum include:
 
 Khanzada Begum (c. 1478 – 1545), a Timurid princess and the eldest daughter of Umar Shaikh Mirza II, the amir of Ferghana
 Maham Begum (died 1534), Empress Consort of Mughal Empire, third wife and chief consort of Babur, Queen Mother of Mughal Empire
 Aisha Sultan Begum, Empress consort of Ferghana Valley and Samarkand as the first wife of Emperor Babur
 Zainab Sultan Begum, Empress consort of Ferghana Valley and Kabul as the second wife of the first Emperor Babur.
 Masuma Sultan Begum (died 1509), Empress consort of Ferghana Valley and Samarkand as the fourth wife of Emperor Babur
 Gulbadan Begum (c. 1523 – 1603), Mughal princess and the youngest daughter of Emperor Babur
 Yakhan Begum, a Karkiya princess, daughter of the last Karkiya ruler Khan Ahmad Khan (r. 1538–1592)
 Bega Begum (c. 1511 – 1582), Empress consort of the Mughal Empire and first and chief consort of the second Mughal emperor Humayun
 Hamida Banu Begum (c. 1527 – 1604), Empress Consort of the Mughal Empire as wife of emperor Humayun, Queen mother of Mughal Empire 
 Mah Chuchak Begum (died 1564), wife of the second Mughal emperor Humayun
 Bakshi Banu Begum (born 1540), Mughal princess and was the second daughter of Emperor Humayun
 Bakht-un-Nissa Begum (c. 1547 - 1608), a Mughal princess, the daughter of Mughal emperor Humayun
 Wali Nimat Mariam-uz-Zamani Begum also known as Shahi Begum (c. 1542 - 1623), Empress Consort, chief and favorite wife of Mughal Emperor Akbar (1562-1605) and Queen Mother of Mughal Empire
 Ruqaiya Sultan Begum (c. 1542 - 1626), first and chief wife of Mughal Emperor Akbar
 Salima Sultan Begum (c. 1538 - 1613), third wife and chief consort of Mughal emperor Akbar and Empress consort of Mughal Emperor Akbar
 Shakr-un-Nissa Begum (c. 1571 - 1653), Mughal princess, daughter of Mughal emperor Akbar
 Aram Banu Begum (c. 1584 - 1624), a Mughal princess, youngest daughter of Mughal Emperor Akbar
 Shah Begum (c. 1570 - 1604), first and chief wife of Prince Salim, future, Emperor Jahangir
 Nur-un-Nissa Begum, (born c. 1570), a Timurid princess, the daughter of Ibrahim Husain Mirza, wife of Mughal emperor Jahangir
 Saliha Banu Begum (died 1620), Empress consort of the Mughal Empire as the wife of Emperor Jahangir
 Hoshmand Banu Begum, Mughal princess, granddaughter of Mughal emperor Jahangir and daughter of crowned prince Khusrau Mirza
 Bahar Banu Begum, Mughal princess, daughter of Mughal emperor Jahangir
 Kandahari Begum (b. 1593), first wife of the Mughal emperor Shah Jahan
 Jahanara Begum (1614–1681), Mughal princess and the eldest daughter of Emperor Shah Jahan 
 Roshanara Begum (1617–1671), Mughal princess and the second daughter of Mughal emperor Shah Jahan
 Gauhar Ara Begum (1631–1706), Mughal princess and the fourteenth and youngest child of the Mughal emperor Shah Jahan
 Nadira Banu Begum (1618–1659), Mughal princess and the wife of Crown prince Dara Shikoh
 Jahanzeb Banu Begum (died 1705), Mughal princess and the chief consort of Muhammad Azam Shah
 Badshah Begum (c. 1703 – 1789), Empress consort of the Mughal Empire as the first wife and chief consort of the Mughal emperor Muhammad Shah
 Ghaseti Begum, the eldest daughter of Alivardi Khan, Nawab of Bengal, Bihar, and Orissa during 1740-1758
 Begum Hazrat Mahal (c. 1820 – 1879), also called as Begum of Awadh, was the second wife of Nawab Wajid Ali Shah
 Lutfunnisa Begum, the second wife of Nawab Siraj ud-Daulah, the last independent Nawab of Bengal

Contemporary (20th-century title)
 Begum Om Habibeh Aga Khan (1906–2000), fourth and last wife of Sir Sultan Muhammad Shah, Aga Khan III
 Mah Parwar Begum (died 1941), Queen of Afghanistan

Given name
 Begum Akhtar (1914–1974), Indian singer of Ghazal, Dadra, and Thumri genres of Hindustani classical music
 Begum Ishrat Ashraf, Pakistani politician
 Begüm Dalgalar (born 1988), Turkish basketball player
 Begum Tabassum Hasan (born 1979), Indian politician
 Begüm Kütük (born 1980), Turkish actress and model
 Begum Khurshid Mirza (1918–1989), Pakistani television actress and film actress
 Begum Para (1926–2008), Indian Hindi film actress
 Begum Rokeya, Bengali feminist thinker, writer, educationist
 Begum Samru, Indian politician
 Sharmila Tagore (also known as Begum Ayesha Sultana), Indian film actress

Middle name
Ayşe Begüm Onbaşı (born 2001), Turkish  aerobic gymnast
Rahil Begum Sherwani (1894-1982), founder of the All India Women's Muslim League

Surname
 Ameena Begum, American Sufi
 Amena Begum, Bangladeshi politician
 Apsana Begum, British Labour Party politician
 Bahar Begum (born c. 1942), Pakistani film actress
 Doly Begum, Canadian politician
 Fatima Begum, Indian actor
 Fatima Begum (politician) (1890–1958), respected woman of the Pakistan Movement
 Fatima Sughra Begum (died 2017), Pakistani activist and figure in Pakistani politics
 Fatma Begum, Indian actress, director, and screenwriter
 Firoza Begum (singer) (1930–2014), Bangladeshi Nazrul Geeti singer
 Julaiha Begum (1948–2001), Singaporean murderer
 Maleka Begum (born 1944), Bangladeshi feminist, author, academic
 Mehnaz Begum (1958–2013), Pakistani singer
 Momtaz Begum, Bangladeshi folk singer
 Momtaz Begum-Hossain (born 1981), English journalist
 Mubarak Begum, Indian singer
 Mumtaz Begum (activist) (19231967), Bengali language activist
 Mumtaz Begum (actress) (born 1923), Indian Bollywood actress 
 Mumtaz Begum (politician) (born 1956), former mayor of Bangalore
 Mumtaz Begum Jehan Dehlavi (19331969), Indian film actress
 Munni Begum Urdu Pakistani ghazal singer
 Naseem Begum (1936–1971), Pakistani film playback singer
 Rehana Begum, Indian artisan
 Ruqsana Begum (born 1983), English kickboxer and boxer
 Shamima Begum, one of three British teenagers who married ISIS terrorists.
 Shamshad Begum (1919–2013), Indian "playback" singer
 Sharmeena Begum (born 1999), left the United Kingdom to join the ISIL in December 2014
 Zubeida Begum (1926–1952), Indian film actress
 Humeira Begum (1918-2002) last Afghanistan Queen consort

See also
 Mirza
 Baig
 Khanum
 Begzadi, decedent of a Beg

Pakistani feminine given names
Turkish feminine given names